The Mizpah congregation is a Reform Jewish synagogue in Chattanooga, Tennessee.

History
A Jewish settlement in Chattanooga can be traced back to before the US Civil War. However, it wasn't until after the war that the Jewish community was really established. In 1860 German immigrants Fannie Schwartzenberg Bach and Jacob Bach made their home there. The Bach family started holding services in their home six years later, Jacob Bach becoming the congregation's first rabbi, cantor, and ritual slaughterer. That same year 21 young Jewish men organized a group called Chebra Gamilas Chaced, which was changed a year later to the Hebrew Benevolence Association. The group received an official state charter in 1867.

The group then purchased land for Jewish community members on the corner of East Third and Collins Street, for a total of $225. In 1869 the congregation got a new volunteer rabbi, E.K. Fischer, who served in this capacity for two years, opening a Jewish religious day school. In 1871 he stepped down due to health reasons.

Dr. Marx Blocks then took control of the congregation. It was under Blocks and his wife, Delphine, that the Jewish community in Chattanooga grew. In 1877 the Hebrew Ladies Aid Society was founded with 33 women. The Congregation's first temple was built in 1882 on Walnut Street near fifth. The group adopted the name Mitzpah, which in Hebrew means "overlook", or "lookout", which refers to Lookout Mountain. The t was later dropped, changing the name to Mizpaw.

Twenty-two years later, in 1904 a new synagogue was built, due to the growth of the congregation, on the corner of Lindsay and Oak Street. The new building seated 350 people, and was the congregation's synagogue for twenty-four years. The Congregation received its first ordained rabbi, Moses J. Gries, in 1889 and he served the congregation until 1892. Although the congregation was not associated with the Union of American Hebrew Congregations, it started using the revised edition of the union prayer book in 1899, having previously used Isaac M. Wise Minhag America. In 1928, Adolph Ochs, publisher of The New York Times and a former Chattanoogan involved in reformed Judaism, built the 3rd Mizpah temple. This temple is still located on McCallie Avenue as a Tennessee Preservation Site.

References

External links
 Mizpah Congregation website

Buildings and structures in Chattanooga, Tennessee
Culture of Chattanooga, Tennessee
German-Jewish culture in the United States
German-American culture in Tennessee
Jews and Judaism in Appalachia
Reform synagogues in Tennessee